Štefan Chrtianský (born 17 August 1989) is a Slovak male volleyball player. He is part of the Slovakia men's national volleyball team. On club level he plays for Hypo Tirol Innsbruck.

References

External links
Profile at FIVB.org
 

1989 births
Living people
Slovak men's volleyball players
Place of birth missing (living people)
Volleyball players at the 2015 European Games
European Games competitors for Slovakia
Slovak expatriate sportspeople in Austria
Expatriate volleyball players in Austria
People from Detva District
Sportspeople from the Banská Bystrica Region